Nils Jansen (born 30 March 1959 in Haugesund, Norway) is a Norwegian jazz musician (saxophone and clarinet), known from several recordings and jazz orchestras.

Career 
Jansen attended the Jazz program at Trondheim Musikkonservatorium (1995–98), and joined band like Ellipse, Per Husby Quintet, "Trondheim Big Band" and Søyr. After moving to Oslo, he has played within orchestras like "Radiostorbandet", med Espen Rud Sextet, Trygve Seim Ensemble, Magni Wentzel Sextet, "Sharp 9", and musicians like Christina Bjordal, Staffan William-Olsson and Håkon Storm.

Jansen and Espen Rud has had a number of performances with the show Jazzmask for Rikskonsertene.

Discography 

Within Søyr
1988: Vectors (Hot Club Records)

With Karsten Brustad
1991: Intarsia (Origo Sound)

With Trygve Seim
2000: Different Rivers (ECM Records)
2005: Sangam (ECM Records)

Within "Østenfor Sol»
2001: Troillspel (MajorStudio)

Within the Magni Wentzel Sextet
2001: Gershwin: Porgy & Bess (Norway Music)

With Helge Sunde & Norske Store Orkester
2006: Denada (ACT), feat. Olga Konkova & Marilyn Mazur

Within Trondheim Jazz Orchestra
2009: What If? A Counterfactual Fairytale (MNJ Records), feat. Erlend Skomsvoll
2011: Migrations (MNJ Records), feat. Øyvind Brække
2011: Kinetic Music  (MNJ Records), feat. Magic Pocket

References

External links
Nils Jansen Biography on LevendeDukker.com

Norwegian jazz saxophonists
Norwegian jazz composers
Male jazz composers
Norwegian University of Science and Technology alumni
Musicians from Haugesund
1959 births
Living people
21st-century saxophonists
21st-century Norwegian male musicians
Ensemble Denada members
Søyr members